The 1993 Men's Junior Handball Championship was the 9th instance of the World Junior Men's Handball Championship. The 1993 IHF Men's Junior World Championship was the 9th edition of the tournament and was held in Egypt from September 8–18, 1993.

Groups for the preliminary round

Results

Preliminary stage
The teams placed first, second and third (shaded in green) qualified to the main round.

Group A

Group B

Group C

Group D

Groups for the main round

Group I

Group II

Placement matches (13–16th place)

Placement Matches (3–12th Place)

11th/12th

9th/10th

7th/8th

5th/6th

3rd/4th

Final

Ranking and Statistics

Final ranking

External links
IX Men's Junior World Championship at IHF.info

Junior
1993
1993 in Egyptian sport
International handball competitions hosted by Egypt